Survival of the Fittest Live is the fifth album by The Amboy Dukes. Released in 1971, it was the band's second album on Polydor Records, and the first where the band was credited as "Ted Nugent and the Amboy Dukes". It was the second Polydor album to chart, and it peaked at #129. There were no accompanying singles released by the record company. The performance was recorded live at the Eastown Theater in Detroit, Michigan, on July 31 and August 1, 1970. Keyboardist Andy Solomon, again, contributed most of the vocals. Except "Prodigal Man" (from Migration album) none of songs were previously released.

Track listing
All songs written by Ted Nugent unless noted.
 "Survival of the Fittest" (Ted Nugent, Rob Ruzga, Andy Solomon, K. J. Knight) – 6:17
 "Rattle My Snake" – 3:00
 "Mr. Jones' Hanging Party" – 4:55
 "Papa's Will" – 9:00
 "Slidin' On" – 3:03
 "Prodigal Man" – 21:20

Personnel
Andy Solomon – Keyboards, saxophone, vocals (lead on tracks 2, 5 and 6)
K. J. Knight – Drums, vocals (lead on track 3)
Rob Ruzga – Bass
Ted Nugent – Guitar, vocals (lead on track 4)

References

External links
K.J. Knight's comments about the album
Eastown Theater at Cinema Treasures

The Amboy Dukes albums
1971 live albums
Polydor Records live albums
Albums produced by Ted Nugent